Angus Jeffers Nicoson (September 30, 1919 – May 1, 1982) was an American football, basketball and baseball player and coach.
He served as the head baseball coach at the University of Indianapolis from 1948 to 1954 and 1956 to 1958. He also served as the school's head men's basketball coach from 1947 to 1976.

References

External links
 Pro Basketball Encyclopedia entry

1919 births
1982 deaths
Indianapolis Greyhounds athletic directors
Indianapolis Greyhounds baseball coaches
Indianapolis Greyhounds football coaches
Indianapolis Greyhounds football players
Indianapolis Greyhounds men's basketball players
Indianapolis Greyhounds men's basketball coaches
People from Clay County, Indiana
Players of American football from Indiana
Basketball players from Indiana
American men's basketball players
Basketball coaches from Indiana